The 2000 Monaco Grand Prix (formally the LVIII Grand Prix Automobile de Monaco) was a Formula One motor race held on 4 June 2000 at the Circuit de Monaco before 100,000 spectators. It was the seventh round of the 2000 Formula One World Championship and the 58th Monaco Grand Prix. McLaren driver David Coulthard won the 78-lap race starting from third position. Rubens Barrichello finished second for the Ferrari team with Benetton driver Giancarlo Fisichella third.

World Drivers' Championship leader Michael Schumacher driving for World Constructors' Championship leaders Ferrari started from pole position alongside Jordan driver Jarno Trulli after recording the quickest qualifying lap time. The race was stopped due to a software glitch in the starting procedure and a collision between Jenson Button and Pedro de la Rosa that created a traffic jam. At the second start, Michael Schumacher maintained his lead into the first corner. After the second round of pit stops, Michael Schumacher's exhaust broke causing a left rear suspension failure and his retirement from the race. Coulthard, in second place, became the new race leader on lap 56. Coulthard maintained his lead throughout the remainder of the race and secured his second victory of the season and the eighth of his Formula One career, with Barrichello a further 15.8 seconds back.

Coulthard's victory allowed him to narrow the lead of Michael Schumacher in the World Drivers' Championship to 12 points. Häkkinen retained third position with Barrichello a further seven points behind. In the World Constructors' Championship, Ferrari retained their lead which was reduced to five points over McLaren. Fisichella's third-place result reduced the gap to third-placed Williams to one point, with ten races of the season remaining.

Background
The 2000 Monaco Grand Prix was the seventh of the seventeen rounds in the 2000 Formula One World Championship and it took place at the  clockwise Circuit de Monaco on 4 June 2000. There were eleven teams (each representing a different constructor) entered for the event and all of them fielded two racing drivers. Control tyre supplier Bridgestone brought the soft and extra soft dry tyre compounds to the Grand Prix.

Going into the race, Ferrari driver Michael Schumacher led the World Drivers' Championship with 46 points, ahead of Mika Häkkinen of McLaren on 28 points and his teammate David Coulthard with 24 points. Rubens Barrichello of Ferrari was fourth on 16 points while Williams's Ralf Schumacher was fifth on 12 points. In the World Constructors' Championship Ferrari were leading with 62 points, with McLaren in second position on 52 points. Williams were third on 15 points with Benetton in fourth with 10 points and Jordan were fifth on 9 points.

Jordan, Sauber, Benetton, Jaguar and Arrows opted to test at the Circuit Ricardo Tormo circuit which made its Formula One testing début that garnered mixed reviews from the drivers. Jordan's Heinz-Harald Frentzen was fastest on the first day of testing, ahead of Sauber test driver Enrique Bernoldi. Jos Verstappen for the Arrows team set the second day's quickest times. Late in the session Fisichella hit the right rear tyre of Jordan driver Jarno Trulli, causing his Benetton to flip over and brought a brief halt to testing. Fisichella suffered minor bruising to his thumb and Benetton withdrew their second driver Alexander Wurz from testing. Sauber's Mika Salo topped the final days running. Williams and BAR went to the Circuit Paul Armagnac circuit which was where the teams undertook shake down runs and used car set-ups. BAR tested a new control system called "Athena 2000" which managed the software of the car's engine and different sections on the chassis. Ferrari tested at their private test facility, the Fiorano Circuit, for five days where test driver Luca Badoer and Michael Schumacher concentrated on aerodynamic and tyre testing, as well as undertaking different set-ups and running on an artificially wet track.

Due to the configuration of the Circuit de Monaco, with its low average speed and abundance of low-speed corners, allied to the low-grip nature of the public road surface, the teams all set their cars up to produce the maximum amount of downforce and mechanical grip possible. Benetton modified their car's suspensions to work better on the circuit's low-speed corners. The Minardi cars came equipped with a new titanium cast gearbox and new rear suspensions. McLaren brought an additional spare car to the event, with four in total being shared between Häkkinen and Coulthard. The team also shipped in six extra monocoques for the Grand Prix. Jordan introduced an evolved version of its Mugen-Honda V10 engine to the Grand Prix and Jaguar fitted a revised engine hood onto their two cars along with a new front wing. The Williams team added an extra fin on their cars engine hood and two minor fins on the sides along with new front and rear wings.

Practice
There were four practice sessions before the Sunday race—two one-hour sessions on Thursday, and two 45-minute sessions on Saturday. The Thursday morning and afternoon practice sessions were held in dry and hot weather conditions. Michael Schumacher set the fastest time in the first session, at 1 minute and 23.039 seconds, three-tenths of a second quicker than Häkkinen. Coulthard was third fastest, ahead of Fisichella and Frentzen. Alesi managed sixth despite suffering from gearbox issues which caused him to pull up on the track. Eddie Irvine of Jaguar, Williams' Jenson Button, Barrichello and Salo made up positions six to ten. Ralf Schumacher made contact with the barrier at the entry to the tunnel for which repairs were necessitated in the pit lane and Minardi's Gastón Mazzacane spun and lost his front right wheel in an accident at La Rascasse.

In the second practice session, Häkkinen set the day's quickest lap, a 1:21.387; Coulthard finished with the third fastest time. The McLaren drivers were separated by Michael Schumacher. Eddie Irvine lapped quicker and was fourth fastest, in front of Frentzen and Ralf Schumacher. Alesi, seventh fastest, continued to encounter problems. Arrows' Pedro de la Rosa, Trulli and Barrichello followed in the top ten. Wurz crashed his car at the Swimming Pool complex, braking his front wing and removing one of his car's wheels. Nick Heidfeld lost control of his Prost car and damaged the right-hand side of his vehicle against the barrier at La Rascasse corner. Pedro Diniz damaged his Sauber entry against the barrier at the same turn and dropped a large amount of oil in the area that marshals attempted to remove.

After taking Friday off – a feature of the timetable that was unique to the Monaco Grand Prix – for leisure time, sponsorship functions and teams preparing their vehicles for the second day of practice, the weather remained hot and dry for the Saturday morning practice sessions. Track evolution was observed during the third session. Michael Schumacher was the third session's fastest driver, setting a lap of 1:20.762; Barrichello was third. Häkkinen set a time one-tenth of a second slower than Michael Schumacher and was second fastest. Alesi continued to run quicker and was fourth fastest, faster than Coulthard, Frentzen, Irvine, Trulli, Fisichella and Sauber's Johnny Herbert. Frentzen and Wurz went off the circuit during the session but avoided damaging their vehicles.

In the final practice session, Coulthard lapped fastest at 1:20.405, going 0.142 faster than teammate Häkkinen's 1999 pole time; he ran down the escape road at Ste Devote to avoid a collision with the guardrail barrier and stalled the engine. Slower cars prevented any improvement in Coulthard's time. Michael Schumacher was second fastest, nearly one-tenth slower than Coulthard. Fisichella opted to use a softer damper and set the third quickest lap. Trulli, Häkkinen, Barrichello, Alesi, Wurz, Frentzen and Ralf Schumacher made up positions four to ten. A crash by Irvine at the swimming pool complex ended his session prematurely.

Qualifying
Saturday's afternoon one hour qualifying saw each driver limited to twelve laps, with the grid order decided by their fastest laps. During this session, the 107% rule was in effect, which necessitated each driver set a time within 107 per cent of the quickest lap to qualify for the race. The session was held in dry and hot weather conditions. Michael Schumacher clinched his second pole position of the season, and the 25th of his career, with a time of 1:19.475 that he recorded with seven minutes remaining; he struck the metal guardrail at Portier corner entering the tunnel with his rear-left wheel but continued. He was joined on the front row of the grid by Trulli who recorded a lap 0.271 seconds slower than the pole sitter and took his best qualifying performance of the season. Coulthard qualified third and said he could have set a better lap time as he saw a yellow flag out on the track. Trulli's teammate Frentzen qualified fourth but criticised Irvine for an apparent blocking manoeuvre. Häkkinen in his worst qualifying result of 2000 took fifth and had understeer along with traffic during his second qualifying run. Barrichello secured sixth position, reporting a nervous car. Alesi, seventh, had alternator problems in his race car in the opening minutes of qualifying and switched to the spare Prost car. Fisichella qualified in eighth position and reported that a worsening in his car's handling. 

Ralf Schumacher and Irvine completed the top ten positions. Herbert set the eleventh fastest time, five one hundredths slower than his teammate and reported excessive oversteer on his car. He was ahead of Wurz in the slower of the two Benetton cars. Salo qualified in 13th position despite a misunderstanding with his race engineer over a yellow flag. Similarly, Button who took 14th in the other Williams, was caught out by the waved yellow flags. Button was slowed by an understeer as well as traction and braking problems. The two Arrows drivers filled the next two positions with Verstappen in 15th and De La Rosa in 16th; the latter crashed at the Rascasse chicane. BAR's Jacques Villeneuve started from 17th after an engine failure entering Lowes corner forced him to stop at the furthest place from the pit lane and laid oil on the circuit. Villeneuve was required to drive his team's spare car for the rest of the session. Heidfeld, 18th, reported experiencing a lack of grip and understeer. He qualified ahead of Diniz and BAR's Ricardo Zonta in 19th and 20th respectively. The two Minardi drivers of Marc Gené and Gastón Mazzacane qualified in 21st and 22nd respectively; both drivers crashed at Rascasse.

Qualifying classification

Warm-up
The drivers took to the track at 09:30 Central European Summer Time (UTC+2) for a 30-minute warm-up session. It took place in dry and warm weather conditions. Barrichello had the fastest time of 1:22.251, with his Ferrari teammate Michael Schumacher second-fastest. Ralf Schumacher recorded the third fastest lap with Coulthard fourth. The session was disrupted when De La Rosa lost traction in his car and striking the barriers leaving Tabac turn shortly before the session concluded – the session was prematurely ended as marshals were required to clear the track – and reduced Arrows' number of available race vehicles to two. Herbert clipped the tyre barrier at Piscine turn in the Swimming Pool complex after spinning on oil on the circuit, which forced him to drive the spare car for the Grand Prix.

Race

Michael Schumacher, Barrichello Häkkinen, Coulthard, Button and Mazzacane began on the soft tyre compound. Bridgestone advised drivers using the soft compound tyre to begin on new sets and those on the supersoft compound to use scrubbed tyres. The circuit at Sainte Devote corner had become slippery due to a two-car accident during the morning Renault Clio Cup undercard round that saw fluids from the crashed vehicles spill onto the track, requiring marshals to lay cement mortar in an unsuccessful attempt to dry the oil puddles. This meant that a driver going wide under braking would lose traction on the asphalt surface.

At the start of the parade lap Diniz was unable to get away and was forced to start at the back of the grid. At the starting procedure Wurz's engine failed and race officials aborted the start. This saw the mechanics return to the grid with their equipment. Diniz, meanwhile, was allowed to start from his qualifying position after Wurz's engine issue. The race began eight minutes later than scheduled; Michael Schumacher maintained the lead into the first corner. Behind him, Trulli remained in second position. Immediately afterwards a glitch in the FIA computer software called for the race to be suspended, however marshals did not wave red flags to signal a race stoppage across the circuit, except for the start/finish line. At the Loews hairpin De La Rosa attempted to overtake Button on the outside but Button's front-right wheel made contact with one of De La Rosa's rear wheels, sending De La Rosa into a spin. This created a traffic jam for six cars who were behind the two drivers and caused the race to be stopped since the track was blocked. All the cars that stopped on the circuit were abandoned. Button, Zonta, Heidfeld, Diniz and Gené restarted in their team's spare cars, and were thus required to start from the pit lane. De La Rosa, however, did not have a spare car available and could not take the restart.

At the restart at 14:31 local time, Michael Schumacher and Trulli again held their positions, whilst Ralf Schumacher made the best start in the field, moving from ninth to sixth by the end of the first lap. Barrichello lost two positions over the same distance. At the conclusion of the first lap, the order was Michael Schumacher, Trulli, Coulthard, Frentzen, Häkkinen, and Ralf Schumacher. Michael Schumacher began to immediately pull away from Trulli as he began setting consecutive fastest laps. Häkkinen started to challenge Frentzen for fourth on lap two. By the 11th lap, Michael Schumacher led Trulli by more than 11 seconds as Wurz overtook Mazzacane for 17th place. Button entered the pit lane because telemetry indicated that his engine was losing oil pressure and he was retired on lap 17.

Michael Schumacher continued to increase his lead to Trulli to 19.5 seconds by lap 19. Trulli was in turn 0.7 seconds ahead of Coulthard. Frentzen was a further 2.1 seconds behind Coulthard and continued to battle the latter's teammate Häkkinen for fifth. On the same lap Irvine overtook his teammate Herbert for tenth position. Wurz lost control of his car and crashed into the barriers at Sainte Devote corner, forcing his retirement from the Grand Prix. Gené retired his car on an escape road at Casino Square corner on lap 22 due to gearbox failure. His teammate Mazzacane collided with the barriers at Sainte Devote turn on the following lap and had to retire from the event. Herbert became the first driver to make a pit stop on lap 27 although his pit crew came unprepared and Herbert was stationary for half a minute before he exited in 17th position. On the 31st lap, Diniz hit the barriers at Sainte Devote corner, retiring due to damage to his left-rear wheel. The safety car was not deployed for Diniz's accident since marshals moved his car behind the barriers. 

By lap 36, Häkkinen slowed due to a brake pedal blockage and made an unscheduled pit stop. His team's mechanics opened his car's inspection hatch and rearranged radio cables. They removed a loose data transmitter which caused the blockage and Häkkinen rejoined in ninth. Trulli became the race's next retirement when he entered the garage with gearbox failure on the next lap. Ralf Schumacher, fourth, struck the Sainte Devote wall on the 38th lap, as the suspension arm penetrated the monocoque. He suffered a deep cut to his leg and was taken to hospital. Michael Schumacher held a 36-second lead over Coulthard by lap 38; Coulthard lapped consistently in the low 1:22 range to close the gap. Verstappen made the first scheduled pit stop on lap 41, five laps in front of Zonta and Heidfeld. Michael Schumacher made a pit stop at the end of lap 49 for a set of scrubbed tyres and 29 laps worth of fuel and retained the lead. Fisichella made a pit stop earlier than expected on lap 51 due to a slow puncture. Frentzen, Barrichello, Salo, and Villeneuve made pit stops over the following three laps. Due to Villeneuve slowing Coulthard, the gap between Michael Schumacher and Coulthard did not significantly decrease until around laps 53 and 54. Michael Schumacher's car suffered a cracked exhaust that leaked gases under the fairing, breaking a lower left-rear suspension mounting arm since the carbon fiber suspension overheated while Schumacher was driving on the track's centre after exiting Anthony Noughes corner on the 55th lap. This lifted the front-right of Schumacher's car off the asphalt, causing him to slow to a near stop. He was required to do a full slow lap of the circuit as he was past the pit lane entry. Ferrari technical director Ross Brawn retired Michael Schumacher in the pit lane after mechanics unsuccessfully attempted to replace the broken arm. Coulthard became the new race leader and made his final pit stop on lap 56. At the completion of lap 57, with the scheduled pit stops completed, the order was Coulthard, Frentzen, Barrichello, Fisichella, Irvine, and Salo.

Häkkinen set the race's fastest lap on the same lap, a 1:21.571 as he closed the gap to Salo in seventh. Verstappen, holding off Heidfeld for ninth, spun 360 degrees into a concrete barrier at the Swimming Pool complex on lap 62 and retired. Verstappen was unhurt. On the 71st lap, Frentzen, who lost concentration, became the race's final retirement when his rear suspension broke in an accident with the wall at the Sainte Devote turn. The accident promoted Barrichello to second and Fisichella to third. Häkkinen started to slow on lap 74. ending his battle with Salo but remained ahead of Villeneuve in seventh. Coulthard was the first British driver to win the Monaco Grand Prix since Jackie Stewart in 1973. Barrichello followed 15.8 seconds later in second, ahead of Fisichella in third. Irvine finished fourth and scored Jaguar's first Formula One points. Salo came fifth and Häkkinen completed the points scorers in sixth. Villeneuve, Heidfeld and Herbert filled the next three positions, with Frentzen the final classified finisher despite his accident.

Post-race 
The top three drivers appeared in Prince Rainier III of Monaco's Royal box to collect their trophies and in the subsequent press conference. Coulthard was delighted as securing victory at the Grand Prix which he considered as one of the races he wanted to win during his career because of the challenges the drivers take on the circuit. He also commented that he wanted to wait until the pit stop stages to get ahead of Michael Schumacher and Trulli to prevent unnecessary repairs to his car. Barrichello revealed that he was conserving his tyres and fuel, as well as being informed by Brawn to slow towards the latter stages of the race. Fisichella said that he was pleased at taking third place. He also revealed that he wanted to remain at Benetton for the 2001 season after his finishing in third position.

Irvine described the Grand Prix as one of the hardest in his Formula One career as his drink bottle did not function correctly along with suffering a blistered foot. He also said that the team's issues were not fully rectified and it would take "six months or so to solve... hopefully we can do it quicker." Salo said that his hands were bruised during the race as his car had no power steering. Nevertheless, he was happy to finish fifth, saying, "I knew that he would find it very tough to overtake here but I made extra sure I didn't leave the slightest gap or make any mistakes. An enjoyable race for me and for the team, who really deserved this result." Michael Schumacher admitted to feeling disappointed after the race, having led the majority of the race until his lap 56 retirement. He stated: "The exhaust was too hot and that was why the rest went wrong. It basically cooked the suspension. I felt a few laps before that something was wrong but there was nothing I could do about it."

Ralf Schumacher suffered a  gash on his left calf. He was taken to Princess Grace Hospital for a routine check-up and his cut was stitched. Ralf Schumacher was later cleared to race in the next Grand Prix, two weeks later. He said that he had no prior indication of where his injuries originated from. Williams had their test driver Bruno Junqueira to fill in for Ralf Schumacher should the need arise. Frentzen admitted he was fault for the accident that prevented him from finishing second. His teammate Trulli expressed disappointment over experiencing a gearbox fault for he had thought he would have won the Grand Prix following Michael Schumacher's retirement.

As a consequence of the race, Michael Schumacher's remained the leader in the World Drivers' Championship though his lead was reduced by ten points to twelve. Coulthard's victory moved him to second place on 34 points, ahead of teammate Häkkinen on 29 points. Barrichello and Fisichella remained fourth and fifth, with 22 and 14 points respectively. In the World Constructors' Championship, McLaren reduced the lead of Ferrari to five points. Benetton in fourth closed the points gap to Williams in third position to one point. Jordan remained fifth on 9 points, with ten races of the season remaining.

Race classification
Drivers who scored championship points are denoted in bold.

  Failed to restart

Championship standings after the race 

Drivers' Championship standings

Constructors' Championship standings

 Note: Only the top five positions are included for both sets of standings.

Notes

References

Monaco Grand Prix
Monaco Grand Prix
Grand Prix
June 2000 sports events in Europe